Algeria competed at the 1992 Summer Olympics in Barcelona, Spain.  The nation won its first ever gold medal at these Games.

Medalists

Competitors
The following is the list of number of competitors in the Games.

Results by event

Athletics

Men 

Track and road events

Field events

Women 

Track and road events

Boxing

Judo

Men

Women

Swimming
Men

Volleyball

Men

Team roster:
Tayeb ElHadi BenKhelfallah
Krimo Bernaoui
Ali Dif
Faycal Gharzouli
Mourad Malaoui
Adel Sennoun
Mourad Sennoun
Foudil Taalba
Faycal Tellouche
Lies Tizi-Oualou

Preliminary round - Pool B

Weightlifting

Wrestling 

Greco-Roman

References

External links
Official Olympic Reports
International Olympic Committee results database

Nations at the 1992 Summer Olympics
1992
Olympics, Winter